Thangappathakkam is a 1974 Indian Tamil-language action drama film, directed by P. Madhavan and written by Mahendran. Based on Mahendran's play of the same name, the film stars Sivaji Ganesan, K. R. Vijaya, Srikanth and Prameela. It focuses on a disciplined Superintendent of Police who is dedicated to his job, while his son, on the contrary, is rebellious by nature and grows to resent his father. Ganesan reprises his role from the play.

Thangappathakkam was released on 1 June 1974. The film was a commercial success, running for over 175 days in theatres, and thereby becoming a silver jubilee film. It served as an inspiration for the Telugu film Kondaveeti Simham (1981), the Kannada film Kadamba (2004) and the Hindi film Shakti (1982).

Plot 
Choudhry is a strict and committed police officer. Though a loving husband and father, his top priority is his duty. While he upholds the principles of justice and honesty, his son Jagan proves contrary to this even at a young age. After his father berates him for skipping school and indulging in gambling, Jagan runs away from home. He lands in Bombay, where he is caught by the police for a petty theft and sent to juvenile prison. Though Choudhry's wife Lakshmi longs to meet their son, Choudhry prevents her as he feels it would hamper Jagan's reformation process.

Years later, Choudhry is promoted to Superintendent of Police. Jagan, after his release, returns home. While affectionate towards his mother, he still dislikes his father. This hatred has been ingrained over the years since his father had ignored him for the sake of duty. Jagan falls in love with a woman named Vimala, marries and brings her home. Choudhry and Lakshmi accept her, hoping that all differences have been sorted out and they would now be able to enjoy domestic happiness. However, father and son are still at loggerheads.

Jagan, who befriended other criminals in prison, indulges in several illegal activities like theft, kidnapping and smuggling, and is wanted by the police. Choudhry tries his best to reform Jagan, but fails. His repeated attempts to reform him are misunderstood by Jagan, who decides to take revenge on his father for blocking his path to easy riches. In their fight, the family splits, and a depressed Lakshmi dies. Jagan does not come even for her cremation.

Jagan decides to sell sensitive military documents to a foreign country for a large sum. Choudhry learns of this, confronts him and persuades him to stop, but Jagan refuses and shoots Choudhry, who is forced to shoot back. Jagan dies in the arms of Choudhry, who survives, and is later rewarded with a gold medal for his valour.

Cast 
Adapted from credits:
 Sivaji Ganesan as S. P. Choudhry
 K. R. Vijaya as Lakshmi
 Srikanth as Jagan/Jagannath
 Prameela as Vimala
 V. K. Ramasamy as Gopalsamy
 Major Sundarrajan as Mayandi
 Cho as Sundaram and Vaiyapuri
 R. S. Manohar as Manimangalam Minor
 Suruli Rajan as Soodamani
 Manorama as Muthammal
 Pushpamala as Karuppaiee
 V. R. Thilakam as Savithiri
 K. Vijayan as D. I. G.  Palanivel
Poornam Viswanathan as Guest Appearance 
 Veeraragavan as Rajasekaran Chettiyar / Inspector Nithyanandan

Production 
Irandil Ondru was a play written by Mahendran for actor Senthamarai. While naming the male lead character, a Superintendent of Police, Mahendran could not find any convincing name in Tamil; he found the Bengali name "Choudhry" convincing, and decided to give the character that name. After seeing the play, Sivaji Ganesan bought the rights and staged the play again with some changes under the title Thangappathakkam, starring as Choudhry. This play, which was inaugurated in 1972, was directed by S. A. Kannan. It became a huge success, being staged more than 100 times. Ganesan's company Sivaji Productions decided to adapt it into a film with the same title, with P. Madhavan directing.

Ganesan's daughter Shanthi Narayanaswamy produced the film along with T. Manohar. Mahendran wrote the film's dialogues and was also credited for the original story. Ganesan reprised his role from the play as Choudhry, K. R. Vijaya was cast as his wife Lakshmi, reprising the role originally played by Sivakami while Srikanth was cast as Choudhry's son Jagan, reprising the role originally played by Rajapandian. Cho was cast in two roles: a politician named Vaiyapuri and his older brother Sundaram, a constable. The politician character was not present in the play. Mahendran did not write any dialogue for the scene where Lakshmi dies, instead he "visually depict[ed] the sorrow of a widower, which was very challenging", although Ganesan managed it successfully in a single take. Cinematography was handled by P. N. Sundaram, and editing by R. Devarajan.

Themes 
According to Ganesan, Thangappathakkam is not about a man killing his son to receive a gold medal, but a police officer's commitment to his post. In his view, the story elucidates the code of conduct for police officers and how they should perform their duties; the character upholds justice, so the title "Thangappathakkam" (meaning gold medal) actually personifies this dutiful police officer. Within the film, Vaiyapuri calls the policy Annaism (introduced in 1973 by politician M. G. Ramachandran, described by him as "a blend of the fine aspects of Gandhism, communism and capitalism") as "Appaism" (Anna meaning elder brother and Appa meaning father), as a means of ridiculing the policy which was known for being very radical.

Soundtrack 
The music was composed by M. S. Viswanathan, with lyrics by Kannadasan. The song "Thatti Sellum" is set in the Carnatic raga known as Valaji, and "Sumaithangi Saaithal" is set in Harikambhoji.

Release and reception 
Thangappathakkam was released on 1 June 1974. F. C. Arul, the then Inspector General of Tamil Nadu, made all possible arrangements to exhibit the film in 16 mm in all police stations throughout Tamil Nadu. On 30 June 1974, the Tamil magazine Ananda Vikatan appreciated the film and mentioned that Ganesan showed how a police officer should behave and live through his fantastic acting, and added that the film was a gold medal for Ganesan. Kanthan of Kalki lauded the performances of the lead cast, particularly Srikanth for portraying a new kind of villain not usually seen in Tamil films, Madhavan's direction and Mahendran's writing. Thangappathakkam was a commercial success, running for over 175 days in theatres, thereby becoming a silver jubilee film. It won the Chennai Film Fans' Association Awards for Best Film, Best Actor (Ganesan), Best Story (Mahendran) and Best Actress (Vijaya).

Impact 
Thangappathakkam was dubbed in Telugu as Bangaru Pathakkam in 1976. It served as an inspiration for the Telugu film Kondaveeti Simham (1981), the Kannada film Kadamba (2004), and the Hindi film Shakti (1982). According to Rediff's N. Sathiya Moorthy, Ganesan's characterisation of Choudhry "became a role model for aspiring young police officers". The characterisation of the role became a benchmark in such a way that many later Tamil films would often refer to Choudhry when mentioning an "honest and upright officer". According to film historian G. Dhananjayan, the scene where Choudhry does not utter even a word after his wife's demise "is the way [Mahendran] started his brand of cinema".

References

Bibliography

External links 
 

1970s action drama films
1970s Tamil-language films
1974 films
Fictional portrayals of the Tamil Nadu Police
Filicide in fiction
Films directed by P. Madhavan
Films scored by M. S. Viswanathan
Indian action drama films
Indian films based on plays
Indian police films
Tamil films remade in other languages